This is a list of events in the year 2017 in the  Republic of the Congo.

Incumbents
 President: Denis Sassou Nguesso

Events
Ongoing since April 2016 – the Pool War
16 July – Republic of the Congo parliamentary election, 2017

Sport
 Congo at the 2017 World Championships in Athletics

Deaths
7 May – Auguste Batina, politician (b. 1936).
9 August – Raymond Damase Ngollo, general (b. 1936)

References

 
2010s in the Republic of the Congo 
Years of the 21st century in the Republic of the Congo 
Congo 
Congo